Op Khan National Park (or Ob Khan National Park) is a national park in Chiang Mai Province in Thailand.

History
Op Khan National Park (preparation) was officially established in 1992.

Geography
The park spans the districts of Samoeng, San Pa Tong, Hang Dong, and Mae Wang. It is adjacent to Doi Suthep–Pui National Park to the east, and Mae Wang National Park and Doi Inthanon National Park to the west. It occupies 141,756 rai ~ . The park headquarters is located in Hang Dong district.

Khun Tian is the highest point at 1,550 metres above sea level. The mountains in the park form part of the Thanon Thong Chai Range.

Villages located within the park boundaries include the Hmong village of Ban Huai Siew.

Flora and fauna
Trees include Irvingia malayana, Anisoptera costata, Tectona grandis, Lagerstroemia calyculata, and Schleichera oleosa, while wildlife includes mainland serows, common muntjac, fishing cats, mouse deer, Asian palm civets, mongoose, porcupines, and others.

Notable caves include Grasshopper Cave.

See also

List of national parks of Thailand
List of Protected Areas Regional Offices of Thailand

References

National parks of Thailand
Protected areas established in 1992
Geography of Chiang Mai province
Tourist attractions in Chiang Mai province
1992 establishments in Thailand
Thanon Thong Chai Range